Yoko Tsuno is a comics album series created by the Belgian writer Roger Leloup published by Dupuis in Spirou magazine since its debut in 1970. Through thirty volumes, the series tell the adventures of Yoko Tsuno, a female electrical engineer of Japanese origin surrounded by her close friends, Vic Video and Pol Pitron (see Yoko Tsuno characters). Their adventures bring them to, among other places, Belgium (Bruges), Germany, Scotland, Japan, Hong Kong, Indonesia and also into outer space. The stories are heavily technology driven, with concepts like robot dragons (Le Dragon de Hong Kong), suspended animation (La Frontière de la vie), time travel (La Spirale du temps and others), and even an alien species called the Vineans. Despite the often exotic settings and science-fiction plot lines, the stories generally remain realistic on the personal level between the characters and friendship, love and spirituality are some of the key themes of the series. The art is drawn in Ligne claire style, although having originally started out in the Marcinelle style. When depicting real-world settings, Leloup aspires to be as true to reality as possible, with places like Burg Katz or Rothenburg ob der Tauber depicted with almost photographic skill.

Publication history
Yoko Tsuno first appeared in the Franco-Belgian comics magazine Spirou on September 24, 1970 with the 8 page short Hold–up en hi–fi. This and the following two shorter works La belle et la bête and Cap 351 served as precursors for the first full-length Yoko Tsuno adventure, Le trio de l'étrange serialised in Spirou from May 13, 1971. Staying with Spirou for the following 30 years, the series still appears in the magazine to date. The series has accumulated 29 albums and has been collected in nine integral compilations.

Characters

Yoko Tsuno
Yoko Tsuno is an electrical engineer, who was raised in Japan but now lives in Belgium. She is quite compassionate and has a knack for making friends. Yoko is also a skilled scuba diver, holds a black belt in aikido, and can pilot both gliders and helicopters. This wide range of competences, together with her near-flawless behaviour, makes Yoko fall into the classic category of a competent woman. The flaw she does admit to having is the typically Japanese trait of valuing personal honour highly, which leads her at times to be trusting to the point of blindness.
Yoko Tsuno's first name was inspired by Japanese actress Yoko Tani.

Vic Video

Vic Video (but sometimes also referred to as Max): He has a strong personality, and is a close friend of Yoko (whom he seems to be in love with, though this is only hinted at). Before meeting Yoko, he directed live TV shows. He is often the voice of reason and prudence moderating Yoko's impulsiveness. Vic appears in all albums except Aventures électroniques, L'Or du Rhin and La Pagode des brumes.

Pol Pitron

Pol Pitron is the comic relief of the trio. His name comes from French "pitre", literally "clown". Before meeting Yoko, he worked as a camera operator under direction of Vic. Pol is often lazy and grumpy, as well as a real gourmet. He is also playful and thus quite fond of children, and during a time travel adventure to 16th century Bruges, he gains a fiancée named Mieke, which brings his childish side down by some degrees (L'Astrologue de Bruges).Pol appears in all albums except La Pagode des brumes, although he appears in only two stories of Aventures électroniques. Where almost all other characters in the comics are drawn realistically anatomically speaking, in the early albums, Pol's nose and eyes are cartoonishly large and round.

Khany
Khany is a member of the extraterrestrial race of Vineans, who left their planet when it faced destruction by its twin suns and erected secret subterranean colonies on various habitable planets, including Earth. As of the end of La Forge de Vulcain and the fall of Karpan's leadership, she is also their undeclared leader who directs the return of the Vineans from Earth to Vinea. She is also undertaking expeditions to find lost Vinean colonies. Like Vic, she is quite careful in her actions. Khany appears in Le Trio de l'étrange, La Forge de Vulcain, Les Trois soleils de Vinéa, Les Titans, La Lumière d'Ixo, Les Archanges de Vinéa, Les Exilés de Kifa, La Porte des âmes, La Servante de Lucifer and Le Secret de Khâny.

Poky
Khany's younger sister, and originally her twin sister, who was revived from suspended animation much later than Khany after their arrival on Earth and has thus remained a child. She is quite attached to Yoko and has become close friends with Morning Dew. She appears, nearly always at her sister's side, in Le Trio de l'étrange, La Forge de Vulcain, Les Trois soleils de Vinéa, Les Titans, La Lumière d'Ixo, Les Archanges de Vinéa, Les Exilés de Kifa, La Porte des âmes, La Servante de Lucifer and Le Secret de Khâny.

Rosée du Matin
Rosée du Matin (Morning Dew; Dutch: Roosje; German: Morgentau) is Yoko's adopted Chinese daughter, as of Le Dragon de Hong Kong. The child of two biologists who experimented with the artificial enlargement of animals, she was orphaned when her parents perished in a storm. She had been raised by her grandfather, but due to his deteriorating health, he entrusted guardianship to Yoko. She has so far also participated in Yoko's time travel exploits and her trips into outer space. Rosée appears in all albums from Le Dragon de Hong Kong onwards. She was inspired by Leloup's daughter, adopted from Korea.

Ingrid Hallberg
A German organist who becomes one of Yoko's closest friends after Yoko helped solve the mystery of her father's murder in L'Orgue du Diable. While she has never met them, Ingrid also knows about Yoko's connection to the Vineans (Le temple des immortels). She has since appeared in La Frontière de la vie, Le Feu de Wotan, L'Or du Rhin and Le temple des immortels.

Monya
Monya is a fourteen-year-old time traveler from 3872, whom Yoko meets during the events described in La Spirale du temps. After changing history during this adventure, Monya is unable to return to her native time. She is adopted by Yoko's cousin and the two girls become fast friends. With the help of Monya's time machine, the translateur, Yoko and her friends undertake several time-travelling adventures.

Emilia
A spirited fourteen-year-old girl of Scottish-Russian descent, who appears in the series as of Le Septième Code. While she is not a skilled violin player as her mother was (and wanted her daughter to be), she demonstrates a natural aptitude for piloting. In La Servante de Lucifer, she is also revealed to have some latent telepathic talent.

Myna and Angela
Two female Vinean nursery androids. While Myna is an older construct from before the Vinean exodus (Les Exilés de Kifa), Angela was built as a gift for Morning Dew based on a children's book Morning Dew had left behind during a previous visit on Vinea (La Servante de Lucifer).

Bonnie
A young half-African girl from Kenya who was sired by Emilia's great-granduncle in the early 20th century and taken in by his brother (Sir Archibald, Emilia's great-grandfather) and sister-in-law. Not feeling at home in Europe because of her mixed-race heritage and the resulting social prejudice, she accompanied Yoko and Emilia, who had journeyed into the past, back to the 21st century, where she has taken up permanent residence (Le Maléfice de l'améthyste).

Synopsis
Yoko Tsuno first meets Vic and Pol when they catch her trying to break into a laboratory in Le Trio de l'étrange. The moment the men confront her, the owner of the laboratory explains that he hired the Japanese girl to test a burglar alarm system. Vic, intrigued by Yoko's knowledge in electrical engineering and planning to do an independent television production with Pol as the cameraman, asks Yoko to come along. However, their filming operation turns out to become the first of a whole series of strange adventures, as they stumble upon a secret underground enclave inhabited by a highly advanced, blue-skinned people, the Vineans. This adventure forges a strong friendship between the three, inspiring them to stay together as the "Strange Trio", who join each other on surreal adventures on Earth, in outer space, and even the depths of bygone times.

The main characters are based in Belgium, although adventures take place around the world and even in the Vinean solar system, 2,500,000 light years away. When the stories are Earth-based, they mostly take place in existing settings, such as the German locations Burg Katz and Rothenburg ob der Tauber, Hong Kong, or the Belgian city of Bruges.

Books

Albums

L'Écume de l'aube

Roger Leloup also wrote a novel with Yoko as the heroine, published in 1991: L'Écume de l'aube (The Froth of Dawn), which relates the childhood and youth of Yoko Tsuno.

Translations
Books from the Yoko Tsuno series have been translated from French to sixteen languages: Basque, Catalan, Chinese, Danish, Dutch, English, Finnish, German, Greek, Icelandic, Indonesian, Italian, Norwegian, Portuguese, Spanish and Swedish.

English translations
As of 2015, only a limited number of Yoko Tsuno comics have been translated to English. Books #3 and 6 (La Forge de Vulcain and Les Trois soleils de Vinéa) were released in English in 1989 under the series title, The Adventures of Yoko, Vic and Paul by Catalan Communications under their "Comcat" line. Some liberties were taken in the translation to English. For example, Yoko's last name was changed to "Suno", Khany was renamed "Kani" and the Vineans became "Vinans" from the planet "Vina". Plot transitions between individual episodes were also altered; for instance, at the conclusion of The Prey and the Ghost (original issue #12), Vic tells Yoko in the original version that he was contacted by Khany, leading to the events of issue #13, The Archangels of Vinea; in the English translation, instead he tells her that it was her father who gave him a message for her, which in the Comcat line of continuity would lead to Daughter of the Wind (original issue #9).

Comcat planned next on reprinting books nos. 8, 10, 13, and possibly no. 17, but the company went under.

Sixteen books have been translated into English and published by Cinebook Ltd:

 On the Edge of Life (La Frontière de la vie), published July 2007, 
 The Time Spiral (La Spirale du temps), published January 2008, 
 The Prey and the Ghost (La Proie et l'ombre), published July 2008, 
 Daughter of the Wind (La Fille du Vent), published July 2009, 
 The Dragon of Hong Kong (Le Dragon de Hong Kong), published July 2010, 
 The Morning of the World (Le Matin du Monde), published June 2011, 
 The Curious Trio (Le trio de l'étrange), published July 2012, 
 The Devil's Organ (L'Orgue du Diable), published July 2013, 
 The Forge of Vulcan (La Forge de Vulcain), published August 2014, 
 Message for Eternity (Message pour l'éternité), published August 2015, 
 The Three Suns of Vinea (Les Trois soleils de Vinéa), published May 2016, 
 The Titans (Les Titans), published May 2017, 
 The Light of Ixo (La Lumière d'Ixo), published April 2018, 
 The Archangels of Vinea (Les Archanges de Vinéa), published May 2019, 
 Wotan's Fire (Le Feu de Wotan), published May 2020, 
 The Cannon of Kra (Le Canon de Kra), published May 2021,

Chinese translations
The Hong Kong–based Bayard Press Asia–Le Grain de Seneve Publishing Co. Ltd has published two Yoko stories in Chinese:

 Le Dragon de Hong Kong to 大龍的秘密 (The Secret of Great Dragon), and 
 Le Matin du monde to 巴里島時光歷險 (Time-venture of Bali) in the 90's.

The series title for these albums was changed to 海羽傳奇 (The Legacy of Yoko Tsuno).

Sources

General references 

 Yoko Tsuno publications in Spirou BDoubliées

Citations

External links
 Official website 
 Unofficial website 
 Unofficial website (Wayback Machine copy)
 Unofficial portal 
 Yoko Tsuno character profile
 Cinebook, publisher of English editions of Yoko Tsuno

1970 comics debuts
Action comics
Adventure comics
Belgian comic strips
Tsuno, Yoko
Belgian comics titles
Belgian graphic novels
Comic franchises
Comics about women
Comics characters introduced in 1970
Detective comics
Dupuis titles
Tsuno, Yoko
Tsuno, Yoko
Fictional Belgian people by medium
Tsuno, Yoko
Bandes dessinées
Lombard Editions titles
Science fiction comics